= Jackson Flats, West Virginia =

Jackson Flats
- Unincorporated community
- Location within the state of West Virginia Jackson Flats (the United States)
- Coordinates: 37°19′54″N 81°52′45″W
- Country: United States
- State: West Virginia
- County: McDowell
- Elevation: 2,306 ft (703 m)
- Time zone: UTC-5 (Eastern (EST))
  - Summer (DST): UTC-4 (EDT)
- GNIS ID: 1549758

Jackson Flats is an unincorporated community in McDowell County, West Virginia, United States.
